Praznik u Sarajevu (English: Holiday in Sarajevo) is a 1991 film set in Western Europe and Sarajevo, with a set of Sarajevan thieves returning home for the Christmas holidays. It was directed by Benjamin Filipović and written by Abdulah Sidran.

External links

1991 films
Bosnia and Herzegovina drama films
1991 short films
Bosnian-language films
Films set in Sarajevo